Gary Byrdelle Amdahl is an American author, born August 4, 1956, in Jackson, Minnesota.  He attended public schools, graduating from Robbinsdale High School in 1974.
 
Amdahl has published six books, and produced nine plays. He was awarded two Jerome Fellowships at The Playwrights' Center in Minneapolis, and was a participant in Midwest Playlabs in 1985. His stories, essays, poetry (original, translated, and set to music), book and theater reviews, literary feature articles, and interviews have appeared in Agni, A Public Space, The Massachusetts Review, The Gettysburg Review, Fiction, The Quarterly, Santa Monica Review, Spolia, Third Bed, Minnetonka Review, New York Times Book Review, Los Angeles Times Book Review, Los Angeles Review of Books, The Nation, The Washington Post, The Boston Globe, Zyzzyva, Rain Taxi, and many other monthlies, weeklies, and dailies.

Amdahl has been married to author Leslie Brody since 1989.

Books

A Motel of the Mind with Leslie Brody (2001, Philos Press)
Visigoth (2006, Milkweed Editions, winner of ME National Fiction Prize)
I Am Death (2008, Milkweed Editions)
The Intimidator Still Lives in Our Hearts (2013, Artistically Declined Press)
Across My Big Brass Bed (2014, Artistically Declined Press)
Much Ado About Everything: Oration on the Dignity of the Novelist (2016, Massachusetts Review Working Title)The Daredevils (2016, Counterpoint/Soft Skull)

PlaysGoing Down (1980, Gustavus Adolphus College) Fall Down Go Boom (1981, Illusion Theater)Dead Hand (1981, Brass Tacks Theater Collective)Tonight's the Night (1984, Playwrights' Center)Muzzle Flash (1984, Playwrights' Center)The Border (1985, Playwrights' Center)Hawaii (1985, Midwest Playlabs)The Articulate Noose (1987, Red Eye Theater)Getting the Hell Out of Dodge (1989, Actors Theater of Saint Paul)Night, Mystery, Secresie, and Sleep (1989)Dharma Comes to Dinner (2016)Far from Heaven, Safe from Hell (2017)''

References

External links
Are We Stories?
Research Notes: The Daredevils
Review of The Intimidator Still Lives in Our Hearts
Ten Questions for Gary Amdahl
Review of Across My Big Brass Bed
Across My Big Brass Bed Tumblr
Q&A about Across My Big Brass Bed
Research Notes: Across My Big Brass Bed
Book Notes: Across My Big Brass Bed
Down With Amdahl
National New Play Network
Interview

1956 births
Living people
Writers from Minnesota
American male writers
People from Jackson, Minnesota